Events in the year 1981 in Portugal.

Incumbents
President: António Ramalho Eanes
Prime Minister: Diogo de Freitas do Amaral (interim, until 9 January), Francisco Pinto Balsemão (since 9 January)

Events
 9 January - Establishment of the VII Constitutional Government of Portugal.
 4 September - Establishment of the VIII Constitutional Government of Portugal.

Arts and entertainment
Portugal participated in the Eurovision Song Contest 1981 with Carlos Paião and the song "Playback".

Sports
In association football, for the first-tier league seasons, see 1980–81 Primeira Divisão and 1981–82 Primeira Divisão.
 1 and 8 December - 1981 Supertaça Cândido de Oliveira

References

 
Portugal
Years of the 20th century in Portugal
Portugal